Eulamprotes graecatella is a moth of the family Gelechiidae. It is found in Greece. The habitat consists of a salt marsh by the sea coast.

The wingspan is 10 mm for males and 12 mm for females. The forewings are dark grey-brown with four light whitish spots. The hindwings are brown grey. Adults have been recorded at the end of June.

Etymology
The species is named for the country from which it is described, i.e. Greece.

References

Moths described in 2012
Eulamprotes
Moths of Europe